Joel Dreyfuss (born September 1945) is a Haitian-American retired magazine editor.

Personal life
A Haitian-American, Joel Dreyfuss was born in September 1945 in Port-au-Prince, Republic of Haiti.  He grew up in Monrovia, New York City, and Paris.  In 1971, Dreyfuss graduated from City College of New York, and five years later moved to San Francisco.

By February 2012, he and his wife, Veronica Pollard, had moved to Paris to research Dreyfuss' family history and write a book chronicling their emigration from Africa to France to Haiti.  His first draft was finished by late 2016.

Career
Dreyfuss co-founded the National Association of Black Journalists, and he was a nominating judge for the 1981 Pulitzer Prize.  In 1989, Dreyfuss co-authored The Bakke Case: The Politics of Inequality (Regents of the University of California v. Bakke) with Charles Lawrence III.  By December 2009, Dreyfuss' career was over 30 years old.

He has worked for the Associated Press, Bloomberg News, Fortune, KPIX-TV, KQED-FM, the New York Post, USA Today, The Washington Post, and WNET.  He has been a magazine editor for Black Enterprise, InformationWeek, PC Magazine, The Root, and Red Herring.

In September 2011, Dreyfuss decided to retire.  In mid-2016, he became a contributing columnist for The Washington Post Global Opinions initiative.  , Dreyfuss was a member of the Council on Foreign Relations, having been so since at least February 2019.

References

1945 births
American male journalists
American newspaper editors
American online publication editors
American writers of Haitian descent
Associated Press people
Bloomberg L.P. people
City College of New York alumni
Fortune (magazine) people
Haitian emigrants to the United States
living people
New York Post people
people from Port-au-Prince
USA Today journalists
The Washington Post columnists